Billy Johnson also known as Bill Johnson was an Australian professional rugby league footballer who played in the 1920s and 1930s.  He played for Balmain and North Sydney as a second rower.

Playing career

Johnson made his first grade debut in 1929 for North Sydney.  In 1932, Johnson made the switch to Balmain.  Johnson played for Balmain in the 1936 grand final defeat against Eastern Suburbs.

In 1939, Johnson was a member of the Balmain team which claimed the premiership that year defeating South Sydney 33–4 in the grand final at the Sydney Cricket Ground.

Johnson played two more seasons for Balmain before retiring at the end of the 1941.

References

Australian rugby league players
Balmain Tigers players
North Sydney Bears players
Rugby league players from Sydney
Rugby league second-rows